John Llewellyn Moxey (26 February 1925 – 29 April 2019) was an Argentinian-born British film and television director. He was known for directing the horror film The City of the Dead (also known as Horror Hotel, 1960) and directing episodes of The Saint, Mission: Impossible, Magnum, P.I., and Murder, She Wrote. He was sometimes credited as John L. Moxey or John Moxey.

Life and career
Moxey was born in Argentina in 1925. His family operated a coal and steel business out of South America at the time. He attended Rose Hill School, Banstead, Ottershaw College, Bradfield College, and the Royal Military College, Sandhurst.

Before entering the film industry, he served in the Second World War in the 53rd Division Reconnaissance Corps. Beginning his career as an editor, he subsequently went on to direct episodes of the British series London Playhouse and The Adventures of Tugboat Annie.

Moxey's feature film directorial debut was The City of the Dead (also known as Horror Hotel, 1960). He also directed the film Circus of Fear (1966).

For much of his career he focused on directing television, including episodes of the British series Man of the World, The Edgar Wallace Mysteries, Armchair Theatre, The Baron, The Saint, The Avengers and the American series Judd, for the Defense, Hawaii Five-O, Mission: Impossible, Mannix, Kung Fu, Miami Vice, Magnum, P.I., Murder, She Wrote and the pilot episode of Charlie's Angels. He also directed a number of television films, including A Taste of Evil (1971), Home for the Holidays (1972), The Night Stalker (1972), Genesis II (1973), Where Have All the People Gone? (1974), No Place to Hide (1981), and Desire, the Vampire (1982).

References

External links

1925 births
2019 deaths
Graduates of the Royal Military College, Sandhurst
Argentine emigrants to the United Kingdom
Argentine film directors
British film directors
British television directors
British Army personnel of World War II
Horror film directors
Argentine people of British descent
Argentine emigrants to the United States
British emigrants to the United States
Reconnaissance Corps officers